Abonnema, originally known as Nyemoni (which means "covet your own" in the Kalabari dialect of the Ijaw language), is a large town in the Kalabari Kingdom that was founded in 1882. Its territory was discovered by an expedition of four independent chieftaincy houses from the Kalabari city-state (Elem Kalabari).

History
The founders included Chief Ekine Bob-Manuel who sat on the Owukori Manuel stool and served as the first  (Amanyanabo), Chief Young Briggs who sat on the Oruwari Briggs stool, Chief Akpana Georgewill who sat on the Otaji stool, Chief Kaladokubo Standfast Jack who sat on the Iju-Jack stool. These are the four founding houses of Abonnema. Accompanied by these four founding fathers were  Chief Opu-Benibo Granville, Chief Orubibi Douglas, Chief Ngbula Blackduke Oweredaba, Chief Ajumogobia Bestman, Chief Young-Jack, Chief Kala-Akpana Don-Pedro and Chief Aribimeari Membere . The Abonnema Kingdom is currently made up of the four various founding houses.

The houses are headed by head chiefs, and the entire Abonnema Kingdom is headed by the Amanyanabo and head chief of the Owukori Manuel House, which was chosen based on his chieftaincy stool being the oldest of all the stools upon landing in Abonnema. The incumbent chief on the Owukori Manuel stool is therefore the Amanyanabo and primus inter pares of the head chiefs. Various titles have been used to describe the ruler of Abonnema, such as"Amanyanabo", "Chairman of the Council of Chiefs" and "Amadabo". 

The head chief from the Bob-Manuel (Owukori) house has always served as the Amanyanabo of Abonnema. If by reason of his absence due to travel, illness, or death, he is unable to reign, the mantle passes to the next most senior chief. Seniority in Kalabari chieftaincy is only dependent on the date of the chieftaincy stool creation and installation. No amount of wealth or fame can elevate a younger chieftaincy to take precedence over a chieftaincy of an earlier creation.

Today, Abonnema's Amanyanabo is Chief Disreal Gbobo Bob-Manuel, Owukori IX.

Abonnema today
Abonnema grew to become a flourishing major Nigerian seaport during the colonial era. It was host to many European companies. One such company was the Royal Niger Company, which later metamorphosed into U.A.C. 

Abonnema is the headquarters of Akuku-Toru Local Government Area of Rivers State in Nigeria.

Notable people

Chief Disreal Gbobo Bob-Manuel, Owukori IX, Lawyer, Amayanabo of Abonnnema
 Henry Odein Ajumogobia, federal minister of Nigeria
 Tammy Danagogo, De-General E-Processing Center
 A. Igoni Barrett, writer
 O.B. Lulu Briggs, philanthropist, statesman and business mogul
 Nimi Briggs, academic
 Roseberry Briggs, politician
 Disreal Bobmanuel, King of Abonnema
 Patrick Dele Cole, ambassador to Brazil
 Dumo Lulu-Briggs, business magnate, Philanthropist and politician 
 Tonye Cole, business magnate and politician
 Reynolds Bekinbo Dagogo-Jack, politician
 Sumner Dagogo-Jack
 Rowland Sekibo, Politician and philanthropist
 Agbani Darego, first native African to win Miss World
 Ibife Alufohai, winner, Miss Valentine International 2010 and Founder of Miss Polo International
 Alabo Graham-Douglas, politician
 Bikiya Graham-Douglas
 Nabo Graham-Douglas, SAN, Federal Attorney-General and Commissioner for Justice

 Adolphus Godwin Karibi-Whyte      JSC,CON,CFR
Judge,Supreme Court of Nigeria(1984-2002)
 
Judge of the United Nations (International Criminal Court- International Criminal Tribunal for The Former Yugoslavia- 1993-1998

References

Further reading
 Abonnema at Encyclopædia Britannica
 https://okadabooks.com/book/about/trigger_happy/29051
 http://AbonnemaFoundation.org/
 https://www.nationalnetworkonline.com/interiews/7524-from-wig-to-crown-celebrations-galore-as-amanyanabo-of-abonnema-marks-10-years-on-the-throne/
 https://www.thenewswriterng.com/2014/04/04/court-confirms-king-disrael-bob-manuel-as-abonnema-monarch/

Towns in Rivers State